The Muppets Valentine Show aired on ABC on January 30, 1974. It was one of two pilots produced during the planning stages for The Muppet Show. The other pilot was The Muppet Show: Sex and Violence, which aired in 1975.
In this half-hour Valentine's Day special featuring the Muppets and special guest star Mia Farrow, host Wally has writer's block—he can't think of material for the show that represents the true meaning of love. He asks the other Muppets and Mia for assistance, with mixed results.

Sketches

 The Muppets perform the opening number, "Love is a Simple Thing."
 Wally, George the Janitor, Mildred and Brewster discuss love.
 Kermit the Frog tells the story of his doomed love affair with Miss Mousey, singing "Froggy Went A Courtin'"
 Mia Farrow enters, and meets the Muppets.
 Mia and Thog perform a duet, "Real Live Girl".
 Mia sings "Believe Me If All Those Endearing Young Charms" to Rufus.
 Kermit reports live from the planet Koozebane, where aliens are about to perform the Galley-oh-Hoop-Hoop.
 Mia discovers that George loves his mop.
 Mia and the Muppets sing "We Got Love".

Home media
The Muppets Valentine Show was released on DVD in 2007, as an extra feature on The Muppet Show: Season Two box set. On the box and on the DVD menus, it is referred to as The Muppets Valentine Special.

The cast of Muppeteers closely matches the lineup of the first season of The Muppet Show, with the exception of Eren Ozker, who joined the Muppets in 1976.

Muppet performers
 Jim Henson as Wally, Kermit, and Ernie
 Frank Oz as George the Janitor, Rufus, Male Koozebanian Creature, and Frogs
 Jerry Nelson as Droop, Thog, Miss Mousey, Female Koozebanian Creature, and Frogs
 Richard Hunt as Mildred Huxtetter and Big Mouse
 John Lovelady as Crazy Donald and Frogs 
 Dave Goelz as Brewster, Frogs, and Crumpet

Additional Muppets performed by Jane Henson and Nancy McGeorge.

External links
 The Muppets Valentine Show at Muppet Wiki

1974 films
The Muppets television specials
1974 television specials
American television series premieres
Valentine's Day television specials
Television shows directed by Jim Henson
Television shows written by Jerry Juhl